Miron or Mirón is a surname of several origins. Spanish surname Mirón: a variant of Catalan Miró or a nickname derived from the verb "mirar", "to look", in the sense 'nosy', 'curious'. French: a diminutive of "Mire". Also a Romanian surname derived from the given name Miron.

Notable people with the surname include:
 Andrei Miron, Romanian professional footballer
 Ami Miron, American Israeli entrepreneur and technologist
 Bogdan Florin Miron (born 1990), Romanian association football goalkeeper
 Bogdan Ionuț Miron (born 1982), Romanian association football goalkeeper
 Brock Miron (born 1980), Canadian skater
 Dan Miron  (born 1934), American critic and author
 Eugenia Miron (born 1992), Moldovan footballer
 François Miron (born 1962), French-Canadian filmmaker
 Gaston Miron (1952–2020), American chess player
 Issachar Miron (1920–2015), Israeli composer
 Javier Mirón (born 1999), Spanish runner
 Jay Miron
 Jeffrey Miron
 Leonard Miron
 Marcel-Ioan Miron (born 1982), Romanian tennis player.
 Mike Miron
 Oleg Miron (born 1956), a sailor from Soviet Union
 Paul Miron (1926–2008), Romanian linguist and philologist
 Rami Miron (born 1957), Israeli Olympic wrestler
 Ray Miron
 Salvador Díaz Mirón (1853–1928), Mexican poet
 Uriel Miron (born 1968), Israeli artist and sculptor

See also
Miron (name)

References

French-language surnames
Romanian-language surnames
Spanish-language surnames